SK Tapa is an Estonian sport club, which is located in Tapa, Lääne-Viru County. The most strongest branch of the club is handball section, which competes in Meistriliiga.

In 1990s and 2000s, the club has also football section, which played in III and IV league.

References

Estonian handball clubs
Tapa, Estonia
Multi-sport clubs in Estonia